Saint John County was a provincial electoral district for the Legislative Assembly of New Brunswick, Canada. It used a bloc voting system to elect candidates, and was created from Saint John in 1795 as Saint John City and County. It lost territory (and two members) to the riding of Saint John City in 1891 and was renamed Saint John County. It was abolished with the 1973 electoral redistribution, when the province moved to single-member ridings.

Members of the Legislative Assembly

Election results

References

Former provincial electoral districts of New Brunswick